Roberto Visentini (born 2 June 1957) is an Italian former professional road racing cyclist who won the White Jersey in the 1978 Giro, finished in the top 10 of the 1979, 1980, and 1981 Giro's, made the podium in 1983, wore the Maglia Rosa for nine days in 1985, three days in 1987 and won the 1986 Giro d'Italia. All total he was the victor in 7 Grand Tour stages.

Visentini was born in Gardone Riviera, in the province of Brescia, and had a brilliant junior career. In 1975, he was both Junior Italian champion and World Champion. As an amateur he won the 1977 Italian time-trial Championship.

He debuted as professional in 1978. In 1980, he won two stages at the Vuelta a España and was ninth overall in the Giro d'Italia. In 1983 Visentini joined the Inoxpran team and was in contention for victory in the Giro with Giuseppe Saronni, but ended up on the podium 2nd place. Riding for the Carrera team in 1984, he won a stage in the 1984 Giro d'Italia and was in a podium position until very late in the race. This race became infamous because French rider Laurent Fignon accused officials of playing favourites by not treating all riders by the same set of rules. Visentini also felt this way making his feelings public.

During the 1984 season he also won a stage in Tirreno–Adriatico and the prologue of the Giro del Trentino. In the 1985 edition, he was in good position to win his first Giro being in the lead for 9 stages when he fell ill and was forced to retire, leaving the victory to Bernard Hinault.

He won the 1986 Giro by defeating racers such as Saronni and Francesco Moser by about 1:00 and 2:00 respectively, and also Greg LeMond who placed 4th. Visentini won stage 6 and took over the Pink Jersey on stage 16 which he would hold for the remainder of the race. Several days later in a mountain stage he was suddenly attacked by his teammate Roche, who had ignored the team's order not to attack. The Carrera team led the peloton in the chase after Roche until Visentini was left without any teammates. From there Visentini tried to chase him down on his own but finished several minutes behind the Irishman, who took back the pink jersey. The significance of this is that when Visentini took the Pink Jersey from Roche on Stage 13 it was an individual time trial, which is a stage of each individual rider versus the clock with no assistance from anyone and the best rider who makes the fewest mistakes wins. When Roche took the jersey from Visentini a few days later he did so by launching an attack against his own teammate, instead of protecting the leader's jersey for the team. Several days later Visentini had to retire from the race because of a broken wrist.

Roche left the Carrera team, which kept Visentini, but he was never again able to compete at this elite level. He concluded his career in 1990 with 18 victories, including the 1986 Giro d'Italia, the 1981 Giro del Trentino and the 1983 Tirreno–Adriatico.

Career achievements

Major results

1979
1st Circuit of Faenza
10th Overall Giro d'Italia
1980
Vuelta a España
1st Prologue & Stage 16b (ITT)
9th Overall Giro d'Italia
1981
1st Overall Giro del Trentino
6th Overall Giro d'Italia
1982
1st Trofeo Baracchi
1983
1st Overall Tirreno–Adriatico
1st Ruota d'Oro
2nd Overall Giro d'Italia
1st Stage 22 (ITT) 
1984
1st Stage 13 Giro d'Italia
Stage in the Tirreno–Adriatico
1986
1st  Overall Giro d'Italia
1st Stage 6
1st Milan-Vignola
1st Circuit of Florence
1987
Giro d'Italia
1st Prologue & Stage 13 (ITT)

Grand Tour general classification results timeline

References

1957 births
Living people
Cyclists from the Province of Brescia
Italian male cyclists
Giro d'Italia winners
Italian Giro d'Italia stage winners
Italian Vuelta a España stage winners